Mark Downey (born 3 July 1996) is an Irish road and track cyclist, who currently rides for French amateur team Côtes d'Armor–Marie Morin–Véranda Rideau.

As a junior he competed at the 2014 UCI Road World Championships in the Men's junior time trial and also at the 2015 UCI Road World Championships in the Men's junior time trial.

On the track he competed at the 2015 UEC European Track Championships in the points race and team pursuit. He won the gold medal at the 2016–17 UCI Track Cycling World Cup, Round 2 in Apeldoorn in the points race. He also won the third round of the World Cup points race held in Cali, Colombia following that event he picked up a silver in the madison with his teammate Felix English. Concluding his 2017 World Cup campaign Downey won the madison in LA round 4 and was overall series winner in the points race.

Major results

Road

2015
 5th Time trial, National Road Championships
2016
 1st Stage 6 Tour Nivernais Morvan
2017
 9th Road race, UCI World Under-23 Championships
2018
 3rd Road race, National Championships
 3rd Overall Volta ao Alentejo
1st  Young rider classification
 4th Road race, Commonwealth Games
 4th Clássica da Arrábida

Track

2016
 1st Points race – Apeldoorn, UCI World Cup
 2nd  Points race, UEC European Under-23 Championships
2017
 UCI World Cup
1st Points race, Cali
1st Madison (with Felix English), Los Angeles
2nd Madison (with Felix English), Cali
 3rd  Points race, UEC European Under-23 Championships
2019
 3rd  Points race, UCI World Championships

References

External links
 
 
 
 
 
 

1996 births
Living people
Cyclists from Northern Ireland
Irish track cyclists
Place of birth missing (living people)
European Games competitors for Ireland
Cyclists at the 2019 European Games
Cyclists at the 2018 Commonwealth Games
Commonwealth Games competitors for Northern Ireland
Cyclists at the 2020 Summer Olympics
Olympic cyclists of Ireland